Paris-Saclay Medical School, also Faculté de médecine Paris-Saclay in French, is the graduate medical school of Paris-Saclay University and is located in the Bicêtre Medical Area of Le Kremlin-Bicêtre, Val-de-Marne, France and founded in 1968. It is the medical school of the first university in France according to its dean.

History 
Created by decree in 1968, the Paris-Saclay Faculty of Medicine saw its walls being built within the hospital grounds of Bicêtre in 1980. It is one of the 7 faculties of medicine in the Paris region.

On July 14, 2020, a study by researchers from the Paris-Saclay Medical School on a case of transplacental transmission of SARS-CoV-2 infection was published in the British journal Nature. The study concerns the case of a pregnant woman, in the last trimester of pregnancy, admitted to Paris-Saclay University Hospital Antoine-Béclère in March 2020.

References

External links 

 

1968 establishments in France
Paris-Saclay
Academic staff of Paris-Saclay University
Paris-Saclay University